What's Funk? is the thirteenth studio album by Grand Funk Railroad, released in 1983. Though the band have continued to tour throughout the years, this stands as their most recent album to date.

Track listing 
All songs written and composed by Mark Farner, except where noted.

Side one
 "Rock & Roll American Style" – 4:29  
 "Nowhere to Run" (Holland–Dozier–Holland) – 2:39
 "Innocent" – 3:05
 "Still Waitin'" (Don Brewer) – 4:05
 "Borderline" – 2:56
Side two
 "El Salvador" – 4:11
 "It's a Man's World" (James Brown/Betty Jean Newsome) – 4:54
 "I'm So True" – 4:10
 "Don't Lie to Me" – 4:18
 "Life in Outer Space" – 4:20

Personnel 
 Mark Farner - guitars, lead and backing vocals, keyboards
 Dennis Bellinger - bass, backing vocals
 Don Brewer - drums, backing and lead vocals, percussion
 Gary Lyons - producer (Tracks 1, 4, 6, 8, 9, 10)
 Cliff Davies - producer (Tracks 2, 3, 5, 7)

References 

1983 albums
Grand Funk Railroad albums
Warner Records albums